Mary Meager Southcott (1862–1943) was a Newfoundland-born nurse, hospital administrator and campaigner.

She went to London, England to study nursing between 1899 and 1901, then returned to Newfoundland and was soon appointed Superintendent of Nursing at the St John's General Hospital, where she founded the St. John's General Hospital School of Nursing in 1903. She was interested in raising educational standards for nurses and, more generally, in the professionalisation of nursing. Her ideas about nursing brought her into conflict with the hospital administration. She resigned in 1916 and was replaced by Myra Taylor.

Southcott remained committed to nursing. As well as setting up her own private hospital she helped to develop midwifery provision and served on the Newfoundland Midwifery Board as well as serving as President of the Child Welfare Association. She set up a Nurses' Register and founded the Graduate Nurses’ Association of Newfoundland.

She was also involved in various campaigns and organisations: in particular as president of the Child Welfare Association, and as an advocate of women's suffrage. She has been named a "person of national historic significance" by the Canadian government.

References

1862 births
1943 deaths
Canadian nurses
Canadian women nurses
Pre-Confederation Newfoundland and Labrador people
Southcott family